The 2002 World Weightlifting Championships were held in Warsaw, Poland from 19 November to 26 November. The women's 69 kilograms division was staged on 22 and 23 November 2002.

Schedule

Medalists

Records

Results

References
Weightlifting World Championships Seniors Statistics, Page 39 
Results 

2002 World Weightlifting Championships